The Prairie Post is a weekly published newspaper for farmers from Medicine Hat, Alberta and Swift Current, Saskatchewan and area.

The Prairie Post East Edition is a weekly newspaper published in southeast Alberta and southwest Saskatchewan. This edition is printed by the Medicine Hat News while the rats edition, that is published in southern Alberta, is printed by the Lethbridge Herald. The Prairie Post is owned by Alta Newspaper Group.

External links
 Prairie Post

Mass media in Medicine Hat
Alta Newspaper Group
Weekly newspapers published in Alberta
Weekly newspapers published in Saskatchewan
Mass media in Swift Current
Publications with year of establishment missing